The 2014 Molson Canadian Men's Provincial Curling Championship, the men's provincial curling championship for New Brunswick, was held from February 5 to 9 at Curl Moncton in Moncton, New Brunswick. The winning team of James Grattan represented New Brunswick at the 2014 Tim Hortons Brier in Kamloops, British Columbia.

Teams
The teams are listed as follows:

Round-robin standings

As of Draw 6

Round-robin results

Draw 1
Wednesday, February 5, 2:00 pm

Draw 2
Wednesday, February 5, 7:00 pm

Draw 3
Thursday, February 6, 2:00 pm

Draw 4
Thursday, February 6, 7:00 pm

Draw 5
Friday, February 7, 2:00 pm

Draw 6
Friday, February 7, 7:00 pm

Draw 7
Saturday, February 7, 9:00 am

Playoffs

Semifinal
Saturday, February 8, 8:00 pm

Final
Sunday, February 9, 2:00 pm

References

External links

New Brunswick
Curling competitions in Moncton
Molson Canadian Men's Provincial Curling Championship
Molson Canadian Men's Provincial Curling Championship